Kodam VI/Mulawarman (VI Military Regional Command/Mulawarman) is a military territorial command (military district) of the Indonesian Army. It has been in active service as the local division for the provinces of North Kalimantan, East Kalimantan and South Kalimantan (from 1958-1985 and from 2010 to present).

Brief history 

The name "Mulawarman" is named after the legendary king Mulavarman of the Kutai Martadipura Kingdom who ruled in the 5th century CE, historically one of the earliest Hindu kingdoms in Indonesia, located in current Kutai Kartanegara Regency, East Kalimantan. 

The 6th MRC, then as the 10th Military Region Command (Komando Daerah Militer X)  holding the Lambung Mangkurat honorific was activated on 19 July 1958 with the headquarters in Banjarmasin and serving South and Central Kalimantan, while the 9th MRC (Komando Daerah Militer IX), holding the Mulawarman honorific, was based in Samarinda and with East Kalimantan as its AOR. Both formations were raised in response to the threat faced by the Permesta revolt the same year as they split from the then 6th Territorial Army (established 1950 on the basis of the Lambung Mangkurat Infantry Division, formerly the 4th Naval Division of the Indonesian Navy established in 1949). This format lasted until the 1984 reorganization of military regions by the Commander of the National Armed Forces, when the 6th MRC was granted the Tanjungpura honorific when it merged with the 10th and 9th MRCs with a new garrison in Balikpapan. In 2010, the INAF split its military region command for Indonesian parts of Borneo into two, thus the 6th MRC, now with a smaller AOR including North, East and South Kalimantan and with its garrison still in Balikpapan, was granted the Mulawaman honorific title.

The 6th MRC serves as the defacto military region for the planned capital city of Nusantara under construction.

Military Territorial units 
The region is composed of 3 Military Area Commands and 1 Training Regiment.

1. Korem 091/Aji Surya Natakesuma with HQ in Samarinda, responsible for East Kalimantan
 Kodim 0901/Samarinda
 Kodim 0902/Tanjung Redeb
 Kodim 0904/Tanah Grogot
 Kodim 0905/Balikpapan
 Kodim 0906/Tenggarong
 Kodim 0908/Bontang
 Kodim 0909/Sangatta
 Kodim 0912/Sendawar
 Kodim 0913/Penajam
 Kodim 0914/Mahakam Ulu
 611th Mechanized Infantry Battalion/Awang Long
2. Korem 092/Maharajalilla, with HQ in Tanjung Selor, serving North Kalimantan
 Kodim 0903/Tanjung Selor
 Kodim 0907/Tarakan
 Kodim 0910/Malinau
 Kodim 0911/Nunukan
 Kodim 0915/Tana Tidung
 622nd Infantry Battalion (New raising)
3. Korem 101/Antasari, with HQ in Banjarbaru, serving South Kalimantan
 Kodim 1001/Amuntai
 Kodim 1002/Barabai
 Kodim 1003/Kandangan
 Kodim 1004/Kotabaru
 Kodim 1005/Marabahan
 Kodim 1006/Martapura
 Kodim 1007/Banjarmasin
 Kodim 1008/Tanjung
 Kodim 1009/Pelaihari
 Kodim 1010/Rantau
 Kodim 1022/Batulicin
 Kodim 1023/Banjarbaru
 621st Raider Infantry Battalion/Manutung
 623rd Raider Infantry Battalion/Bhakti Wira Utama

Training Units
Training units in Kodam VI/Mularwaman are organized under the 6th Regional Training Regiment (Rindam VI/Mulawarman). The units are as follows:

 Regiment HQ
 NCO School
 Basic Combat Training Center
 National Defense Training Command 
 Specialist Training School 
 Enlisted Personnel Training Unit

Combat and Combat support units 
 24th Raider Infantry Brigade/Bulungan Cakti, with HQ in Tanjung Selor
 Brigade HQ
 613th Raider Infantry Battalion/Raja Alam
 614th Raider Infantry Battalion/Raja Pandhita
 615th Raider Infantry Battalion
 600th Raider Infantry Battalion/Modang, with HQ in Balikpapan
 13th Armored Cavalry Squadron/Satya Lembuswana
 13th Armored Cavalry Troop
 18th Field Artillery Battalion/Komposit
 2nd Air Defense Missile Artillery Battalion
 17th Combat Engineers Battalion/Ananta Dharma
 8th Combat Engineer Detachment/Gawi Manuntung

References

See also 
Indonesian Army

Military of Indonesia
Military units and formations of Indonesia
02
Borneo
Kalimantan
Military units and formations established in 1958
Military units and formations disestablished in 1985
Military units and formations established in 2010
Indonesian Army
1958 establishments in Indonesia